Cavolinia inflexa is a species of gastropod in the family Cavoliniidae.

References 

Cavoliniidae
Animals described in 1813